Sinclair QL character set was developed by Sinclair Research for the Sinclair QL personal computer.

Character set

References 

Character sets
Sinclair QL